Franco Dalla Valle (2 August 1945 – 2 August 2007) was a Brazilian Catholic clergyman and Bishop of Juína.

Valle was born in Montechiaro d'Asti, Italy. He was ordained on 26 August 1972, and appointed bishop on 23 December 1997. On 7 January 1998, he became an Ordained Bishop.

Resources
Profile at catholic-hierarchy.org

1945 births
2007 deaths
20th-century Roman Catholic bishops in Brazil
Roman Catholic bishops of Juína